"Some Girls" is a song by British boy band Ultimate Kaos, released in 1994 as the lead single from their 1995 eponymous debut album. The song was a top-10 hit, peaking at  9 on the UK Singles Chart and No. 3 on the UK R&B Singles Chart. In Ireland, the song peaked at No. 22.

Track listings
The US cassette single B-side features snippets from five songs on Ultimate Kaos: "This Heart Belongs to You", "Misdemeanor", "Show a Little Love", "Weekend Girl", and "Believe in Us".

UK 7-inch and cassette single
A. "Some Girls" (7-inch mix) – 4:30
B. "Love You Like This" – 4:26

UK CD single
 "Some Girls" (7-inch mix)
 "Some Girls" (Mafia & Fluxy Mix)
 "Some Girls" (Darkman Ghetto Lab Mix)
 "Some Girls" (Barry B Boom Mix)

UK 12-inch single
A1. "Some Girls" (Mafia & Fluxy Mix)
A2. "Some Girls" (Barry B Boom Mix)
B1. "Some Girls" (Darkman Ghetto Lab Mix)
B2. "Some Girls" (Darkman Ghetto instrumental)

US cassette single
A. "Some Girls" (LP version) – 4:17
B. Album snippets

Charts

Release history

References

1994 songs
1994 singles
Motown singles
Ultimate Kaos songs